Community of Christ membership and field organization is governed by the scriptures, resolutions and Bylaws of Community of Christ and administered by the First Presidency, Council of Twelve and others. To be considered a member of Community of Christ, individuals participate in two sacraments of the church: Baptism and Confirmation. Baptism in Community of Christ is by full immersion and Confirmation is conferred by the "laying on of hands." 

Membership statistics are maintained by local recorders in each congregation and reported electronically. Community of Christ reported 2015 enrollment within Mission Centers a total of 199,485 members, up from 199,268 in 2014. Membership totals for the year 2006 and 2013 - 2018 in each mission center are shown in the table below.  

As of the 2019 World Conference, membership had increased to 251,934 with 201,324 members being enrolled with a Mission Center. The number of Priesthood members as of 2018 stands at 20,579 with 10,052 holding the Aaronic Priesthood and 10,527 holding the Melchisedec Priesthood.

Membership by Mission Center

Field organization
The basic unit of organization in the Community of Christ is the congregation. The congregation is the Community of Christ in its local area and attempts to bring the ministry of Jesus Christ into the surrounding community. Each congregation has a Pastor, Financial Officer and usually several additional, mostly volunteer priesthood members. Congregations belong to mid-level organizational units called a Mission Center. Mission Center Presidents report to a field Apostle who supervises several mission centers in one of eleven mission fields. 

At the 2007 World Conference, a member holding the priesthood office of Seventy was teamed with each of the Apostles, as follows:
 Apostle Linda L. Booth and Seventy Karin Peter in the Southern USA Mission Field
 Apostle Andrew Bolton and Seventy Sam Kumar in the Asia Mission Field
 Apostle Bunda C. Chibwe and Tanoh Assoi in the Africa and Haiti Mission Field
 Apostle Stassi D. Cramm and Seventy John Wight in the Central and Michigan USA Mission Field
 Apostle Mary Jacks Dynes and Seventy Kris Judd in the Canada/North Central (USA) Mission Field
 Apostle Ronald D. Harmon Jr. and Seventy Larry McGuire in the East Central USA Mission Field
 Apostle Dale E. Luffman and Robin Linkhart in the West Central USA Mission Field
 Apostle Rick W. Maupin and Seventy Ruben Landeros in the Caribbean, Mexico and Texas USA Mission Field
 Apostle Carlos Enrique Mejia and Seventy Bob Kyser in the Central and South America Mission Field
 Apostle Susan D. Skoor and Seventy Gina Norton in the Pacific Mission Field
 Apostle Leonard M. Young and Seventy Richard James in the North Atlantic (Europe/USA) Mission Field

Notes

Community of Christ
Religious demographics